Flurina Volken (born 7 September 1993) is a Swiss biathlete. She competed in the 2014/15 World Cup season, and represented Switzerland at the Biathlon World Championships 2015 in Kontiolahti.

Volken represented Switzerland in the Biathlon at the 2018 PyeongChang Winter Olympics.

References

External links 
 

1993 births
Living people
Swiss female biathletes